Keiller McCullough (born 25 March 1905) was an Irish professional footballer who played as a right half and inside right for Belfast Celtic, Manchester City, and Northampton Town.

References 

1905 births
Association footballers from Northern Ireland
Belfast Celtic F.C. players
Manchester City F.C. players
Northampton Town F.C. players
Year of death missing
Pre-1950 IFA international footballers
People from Larne
English Football League players
Association football inside forwards
Association football wing halves